The 1999 Nigerian Senate election in Enugu State was held on February 20, 1999, to elect members of the Nigerian Senate to represent Enugu State. Fidelis Okoro representing Enugu North won on the platform of Peoples Democratic Party, Jim Nwobodo representing Enugu East won on the platform of Alliance for Democracy, while Hyde Onuaguluchi representing Enugu West won on the platform of the All Nigeria Peoples Party.

Overview

Summary

Results

Enugu North 
The election was won by Fidelis Okoro of the Peoples Democratic Party.

Enugu East 
The election was won by Jim Nwobodo of the Alliance for Democracy.

Enugu West 
The election was won by Hyde Onuaguluchi of the All Nigeria Peoples Party.

References 

February 1999 events in Nigeria
Enu
Enugu State Senate elections